The Miami City Cemetery is a historic cemetery in Miami, Florida, United States. It is located at 1800 Northeast 2nd Avenue. On January 4, 1989, it was added to the U.S. National Register of Historic Places.

History
Miami city cemetery was located one-half mile north of the city limits on a narrow wagon track county road. The first burial, not recorded, was of an elderly black man on July 14, 1897. The first recorded burial was a white man named Graham Branscomb, a 24-year-old Englishman who died on July 20, 1897 from consumption. The city of Miami cemetery is subdivided with whites on the east end and the blacks population on the west end.

Blacks provided the primary labor force for building of Miami but were confined by clauses in land deeds to the north west section of Miami now known as Overtown In 1915, the Beth David congregation began a Jewish section. Two other prominent sections are the circles: the first to Julia Tuttle, the "Mother of Miami" buried in 1898; the second, a memorial to the Confederate Dead erected by the United Daughters of the Confederacy. Sixty-six Confederate and twenty-seven Union veterans are buried here. Other sections include a Catholic section, American Legion, Spanish–American War, and two military sections along the north and south fence lines. Among the 9,000 burials are pioneer families such as the Burdines, Peacocks and Dr. James Jackson. This site has the only known five oolitic (limestone) gravestone worldwide. These and the unique tropical plants make this a tropical oasis.

The Miami City Cemetery is one of the few cemeteries where the owners of the plot actually hold a deed to the land where the plot is situated. Approximately 1,000 open plots remain within the City Cemetery but to be buried there the criteria are strict. One must be either the deed holder or able to prove familial relationship to the owner. Friends of the family are not allowed. Currently between 10 and 20 burials occur every year at the City Cemetery.

The Miami City Cemetery is the oldest cemetery and is the first and only municipal cemetery in Miami-Dade County. The cemetery is the resting place for members of many important pioneer families in the City of Miami. Some of these pioneers are known to us by their history and their grave sites. As a result, the headstone and the classical mausoleums embellish the only site associated with many of these individuals.

In 1997 Enid Pinkney and Penny Lambeth began a restoration project of the cemetery. It has been a major transformation.

Notable burials
 Redmond B Gautier Sr. (1877-1944) - Judge, 15th Mayor of the City of Miami.
 Dr James M Jackson (1866-1924) - First resident physician in Miami
 Gustave A Mills (1854-1929) - Developer 
 Julia Tuttle (1848–1898) – The "Mother of Miami."
 John Sewell (1867–1938) – 3rd Mayor of the City of Miami.
  John W Watson (159-1942) - Legislator, 6th and 8th Mayor of the City of Miami.

Gallery

See also
 Downtown Miami Historic District
 National Register of Historic Places listings in Miami, Florida

References

External links

 Dade County listings at National Register of Historic Places
 Florida's Office of Cultural and Historical Programs
 Dade County listings
 Dade County markers
 City of Miami Cemetery
 
 

Cemeteries on the National Register of Historic Places in Florida
History of Miami
National Register of Historic Places in Miami
Tourist attractions in Miami
1897 establishments in Florida